Dominique Blain (born June 22, 1957) is a Canadian artist living and working in Montreal, Quebec. Her work incorporates photography, installation and sculpture. She explores political themes in her art such as war, racism and slavery.

Early life
Blain was born in Montreal, Quebec, and studied art at Concordia University. She relocated to Los Angeles during the late 1980s but came back to Quebec in 1992. In 1996, she graduated from the New York Film Academy.

Exhibitions
Her work has been shown in venues such as the Portland Museum of Art, the Los Angeles County Museum of Art, the Frankfurter Kunstverein, the Stedelijk Museum Amsterdam, the Louisiana Museum of Modern Art in Denmark, the Musée de l’Europe in Brussels and the Museum of Science and Industry in Manchester. Major retrospectives of her work were held: in several cities in Great Britain in 1997-98 by the Arnolfini centre in Bristol (1997-1998); in Quebec City, San Francisco and Rome by the Musée national des beaux-arts du Québec in 1998; and in Montreal, Regina and Calgary by the Musée d'art contemporain de Montréal in 2004. She participated in the Biennale of Sydney in 1992. In Québec, she also participated in three editions of Les Cent jours d’art contemporain and exhibited her work at Galerie de l’UQAM, University of Sherbrooke art gallery, Musée régional de Rimouski and Musée d’art de Joliette.

Public art
Blain has created and installed public art at the headquarters of the Canadian Broadcasting Corporation in Toronto (1994), at the Grande Bibliothèque in Montreal (2005), at the Jardins de Métis in Grand-Métis (2007), at the Jewish General Hospital in Montreal (2008), at the Hôpital du Sacré-Cœur de Montréal (2009), and at the Théâtre du Nouveau Monde (2011).

Awards

Selected collections 
Her art is included in the collections of the National Gallery of Canada, the Scottsdale Museum of Contemporary Art, the Musée national des beaux-arts du Québec the Montreal Museum of Fine Arts and the Robert McLaughlin Gallery.

References

External links 
 

1957 births
Living people
Concordia University alumni
20th-century Canadian women artists
Canadian collage artists
Canadian women artists
Canadian installation artists
Canadian sculptors